Jennifer Amie Crystal Foley (born January 26, 1973) is an American actress. She is best known for her roles as Christie Parker in Once and Again and Rachel Taub on House.

Personal life
She married her college boyfriend, Michael Foley, in September 2000. They have two daughters, born in 2003 and 2006.

Filmography

Film

Television

References

External links 
 

1973 births
Living people
20th-century American actresses
21st-century American actresses
Actresses from Los Angeles
American film actresses
American television actresses
Jewish American actresses
Northwestern University alumni
21st-century American Jews